Crownpoint is a census-designated place (CDP)  on the Navajo Nation in McKinley County, New Mexico. The population was 2,500 at the time of the 2010 census. It is located along the Trails of the Ancients Byway, one of the designated New Mexico Scenic Byways.

History

In 1912, Crownpoint was founded by Samuel F. Stacher as an Indian Agency to serve the Navajo People in the Pueblo Bonito Agency of Northwestern New Mexico. A school house, agency office and power house were first built to accommodate future planned establishments.

Chief Becenti, a local Navajo headman, is one of the first documented leaders of the area. He resided north of Crownpoint, where later in the 1930s a small community would be named after him, called Becenti Lake.

In June 1965, Crownpoint was recognized as a local chapter government sub-unit of the Navajo Nation government. There are a total of 110 Navajo chapters across the Navajo Nation. The Crownpoint chapter serves as the center of Eastern Navajo Agency and many tribal offices are located in the community.

Geography
Crownpoint is located at  (35.685890, -108.148350).

Demographics

As of the census of 2000, there were 2,630 people, 749 households, and 599 families residing in the CDP. The population density was 372.3 people per square mile (143.8/km2). There were 937 housing units at an average density of 132.6 per square mile (51.2/km2). The racial makeup of the CDP was 89.09% Native American, 8.78% White, 0.42% African American, 0.38% Asian, 0.23% from other races, 0.04% Pacific Islander, and 1.06% from two or more races. Hispanic or Latino of any race were 1.18% of the population.

There were 749 households, out of which 49.4% had children under the age of 18 living with them, 45.7% were married couples living together, 27.4% had a female householder with no husband present, and 19.9% were non-families. 17.4% of all households were made up of individuals, and 1.9% had someone living alone who was 65 years of age or older. The average household size was 3.51 and the average family size was 4.03.

In the CDP, the population was spread out, with 39.7% under the age of 18, 9.4% from 18 to 24, 27.6% from 25 to 44, 19.4% from 45 to 64, and 3.9% who were 65 years of age or older. The median age was 26 years. For every 100 females, there were 90.0 males. For every 100 females age 18 and over, there were 80.7 males.

The median income for a household in the CDP was $29,792, and the median income for a family was $31,384. Males had a median income of $25,040 versus $24,704 for females. The per capita income for the CDP was $9,964. About 26.1% of families and 27.3% of the population were below the poverty line, including 33.8% of those under age 18 and 19.6% of those age 65 or over.

Education
It is in Gallup-McKinley County Public Schools. Crownpoint High School is the area high school. The main campus of Navajo Technical University is located in Crownpoint.

See also

 List of census-designated places in New Mexico

References

External links

Census-designated places in McKinley County, New Mexico
Census-designated places in New Mexico
Populated places on the Navajo Nation